Sir Edmund Percival Hillary  (20 July 1919 – 11 January 2008) was a New Zealand mountaineer, explorer, and philanthropist. On 29 May 1953, Hillary and Sherpa mountaineer Tenzing Norgay became the first climbers confirmed to have reached the summit of Mount Everest. They were part of the ninth British expedition to Everest, led by John Hunt. From 1985 to 1988 he served as New Zealand's High Commissioner to India and Bangladesh and concurrently as Ambassador to Nepal.

Hillary became interested in mountaineering while in secondary school. He made his first major climb in 1939, reaching the summit of Mount Ollivier. He served in the Royal New Zealand Air Force as a navigator during World War II and was wounded in an accident. Prior to the Everest expedition, Hillary had been part of the British reconnaissance expedition to the mountain in 1951 as well as an unsuccessful attempt to climb Cho Oyu in 1952.

As part of the Commonwealth Trans-Antarctic Expedition he reached the South Pole overland in 1958. He subsequently reached the North Pole, making him the first person to reach both poles and summit Everest. Time named him one of the 100 most influential people of the 20th century.

Beginning in 1960, Hillary devoted himself to assisting the Sherpa people of Nepal through the Himalayan Trust, which he established. His efforts are credited with the construction of many schools and hospitals in Nepal. Hillary had numerous honours conferred upon him, including the Order of the Garter in 1995. Upon his death in 2008, he was given a state funeral in New Zealand.

Early life

Hillary was born to Percival Augustus (1885–1965) and Gertrude (née Clark) (1892–1965) Hillary in Auckland, New Zealand, on 20 July 1919. His father Percy had served at Gallipoli with the 15th (North Auckland) Regiment, and was discharged "medically unfit" from the Army in 1916; he had married Gertrude after his return to New Zealand. His grandfather Edmund Raymond Hillary (b. 1836) from Lancashire, England was a watchmaker, who immigrated to northern Wairoa in the mid-19th century. He married Annie "Ida" Fleming from Ireland having four children. His maternal great-grandparents, the Clarks, were both from Yorkshire.

His family moved to Tuakau, south of Auckland, in 1920, after Percy was allocated eight acres (3.2 ha) of land there as a returned soldier. Percy had been a journalist prewar, and soon became founding editor of the weekly Tuakau District News as well as an apiarist. Ed had a sister June (born 1917) and a brother Rex (born 1920).

Hillary was educated at Tuakau Primary School and then Auckland Grammar School. He finished primary school aged 11 or two years early, and at "Grammar" achieved average marks. His mother wanted him to go to a "good school" and he commuted by train, cycling to Tuakau station before 7 am and returning after 6 pm for  years (a one-hour and 40 minutes journey each way) until the family moved to Remuera, Auckland in 1935, his last of four years at "Grammar".

He was initially smaller than his peers and shy, and did not enjoy "Grammar", where commuting barred him from after-school activities. He grew to be  and gained confidence after taking up boxing.

He became interested in climbing when he was 16 following a 1935 school trip to Mount Ruapehu, after which he showed more interest in tramping than in studying and said he "wanted to see the world". He then attended Auckland University College, and joined the Tramping Club there. But in 1938, "after two notably unsuccessful years studying mathematics and science" he gave up on formal education.

He then became an apiarist (beekeeper) with his father and brother Rex; with 1600 hives to attend, thousands of 90 lb (41 kg) boxes of honey comb to handle, and 12 to 100 bee-stings daily. He kept bees in summer, and concentrated on climbing in winter. His father also edited the journal "The N.Z. Honeybee" and his mother Gertrude was famous for breeding and selling queen bees.

In 1938, he went to hear Herbert Sutcliffe, the proponent of a life philosophy called "Radiant Living", with his family. The family all became foundation members, and his mother became its secretary in 1939. He went to Gisborne as Sutcliff's assistant, and in 1941 sat examinations to become a teacher of Radiant Living, getting a 100% pass mark. His test lecture was on "Inferiority – cause and cure". He said of his five-year association with the movement that "I learned to speak confidently from the platform; to think more freely on important topics; to mix more readily with a wide variety of people". Tenets included healthy eating (the salads that June took to university for lunch) and pacificism. He joined the Radiant Living Tramping Club, and further developed his love of the outdoors in the Waitākere Ranges.

In 1939, he completed his first major climb, reaching the summit of Mount Ollivier, near Aoraki / Mount Cook in the Southern Alps. Climbing brought new friends; Harry Ayres and George Lowe became "the first real friends I'd ever had".

World War II

At the outbreak of World War II, Hillary applied to join the Royal New Zealand Air Force (RNZAF) but quickly withdrew the application, later writing that he was "harassed by [his] religious conscience". In 1943, with the Japanese threat in the Pacific and the arrival of conscription, he joined the RNZAF as a navigator in No. 6 Squadron RNZAF and later No. 5 Squadron RNZAF on Catalina flying boats. In 1945, he was sent to Fiji and to the Solomon Islands, where he was badly burnt in an accident.

Expeditions
In January 1948, Hillary and others ascended the south ridge of Aoraki / Mount Cook, New Zealand's highest peak. He took part in an arduous rescue on La Perouse in 1948, befriending fellow climber Norman Hardie.

In 1951 he was part of a British reconnaissance expedition to Everest led by Eric Shipton, before joining the successful British attempt of 1953. In 1952, Hillary and George Lowe were part of the British team led by Shipton, that attempted Cho Oyu. After that attempt failed due to the lack of a route from the Nepal side, Hillary and Lowe crossed the Nup La pass into Tibet and reached the old Camp II, on the northern side, where all the previous expeditions had camped.

1953 Everest expedition

In 1949, the long-standing climbing route to the summit of Everest was closed by Chinese-controlled Tibet. For the next several years, Nepal allowed only one or two expeditions per year.

In 1952, Hillary learned that he and Lowe had been invited by the Joint Himalayan Committee for the 1953 British attempt and immediately accepted. Shipton had been named as leader but was replaced by Hunt. Hillary objected but was immediately impressed by Hunt's energy and determination. Hunt asked Charles Evans and Hillary to form with him a small three-man planning group on the expedition. Hunt wrote that:

Hillary had hoped to climb with Lowe, but Hunt named two teams for the ascent: Tom Bourdillon and Charles Evans; and Hillary and Tenzing. Hillary, therefore, made a concerted effort to forge a working friendship with Tenzing. Hillary wrote, "Tenzing had substantially greater personal ambition than any Sherpa I had met."

Lowe supervised the preparation of the Lhotse Face, a huge and steep ice face, for climbing. Hillary forged a route through the treacherous Khumbu Icefall.

Cameraman Tom Stobart was Hillary's room-mate in Kathmandu. He described Hillary as:

On 26 May, Bourdillon and Evans attempted the climb but turned back when Evans's oxygen system failed. The pair had reached the South Summit, coming within 300 vertical feet (91 m) of the summit. Hunt then directed Hillary and Tenzing to attempt the summit.

Snow and wind delayed them at the South Col for two days. They set out on 28 May with the support of Lowe, Alfred Gregory, and Ang Nyima. On the following morning Hillary discovered that his boots had frozen solid outside the tent. He spent two hours warming them over a stove before he and Tenzing, wearing  packs, attempted the final ascent. The final obstacle was the 40-foot (12 m) rock face later called "Hillary Step"; Hillary later wrote:

Tenzing in his 1955 autobiography wrote that Hillary took the first step onto the summit and he followed. They reached Everest's 29,028 ft (8,848 m) summitthe highest point on earthat 11:30 am.

They spent about 15 minutes at the summit. Hillary took a photo of Tenzing posing with his ice-axe, but there is no photo of Hillary; Tenzing's autobiography says that Hillary simply declined to have his picture taken. They also took photos looking down the mountain.

Tenzing left chocolates at the summit as an offering, and Hillary left a cross given to him by John Hunt. Their descent was complicated by drifting snow which had covered their tracks. The first person they met was Lowe; Hillary said, "Well, George, we knocked the bastard off."

They returned to Kathmandu a few days later and learned that Hillary had already been appointed a Knight Commander of the Order of the British Empire and Hunt a Knight Bachelor. News reached Britain on the day of Queen Elizabeth II's coronation, and the press called it a coronation gift. 
The 37 members of the party later received the Queen Elizabeth II Coronation Medal with  engraved along the rim.
In addition to the knighting of Hillary and Hunt, Tenzingineligible for knighthood as a Nepalese citizenreceived the George Medal. Tenzing also received the Star of Nepal from King Tribhuvan.

After Everest

Hillary climbed ten other peaks in the Himalayas on further visits in 1956, 1960–1961, and 1963–1965. He also reached the South Pole as part of the Commonwealth Trans-Antarctic Expedition, for which he led the New Zealand section, on 4 January 1958. His party was the first to reach the Pole overland since Amundsen in 1911 and Scott in 1912, and the first ever to do so using motor vehicles.

An assault on Makalu, the world's fifth-highest mountain, was unsuccessful. Hillary was with the expedition for five months, although it lasted for ten.

The expedition also searched for the fabled abominable snowman. No evidence of Yetis was found, instead footprints and tracks were proven to be from other causes. During the expedition, Hillary travelled to remote temples which contained "Yeti scalps"; however after bringing back three relics, two were shown to be from bears and one from a goat antelope. Hillary said after the expedition: "The yeti is not a strange, superhuman creature as has been imagined. We have found rational explanations for most yeti phenomena".

In 1962, he was a guest on the television game show What's My Line?; he stumped the panel, comprising Dorothy Kilgallen, Arlene Francis, Bennett Cerf, and Merv Griffin.
In 1977, he led a jetboat expedition, titled "Ocean to Sky", from the mouth of the Ganges River to its source. From 1977 to 1979 he commentated aboard Antarctic sightseeing flights operated by Air New Zealand, and was scheduled to act as the guide for the fatal Flight 901, but had to cancel owing to other commitments.
In 1985, he accompanied Neil Armstrong in a small twin-engined ski plane over the Arctic Ocean and landed at the North Pole. Hillary thus became the first man to stand at both poles and on the summit of Everest. This accomplishment inspired generations of explorers to compete over what later was defined as Three Poles Challenge.
In January 2007, Hillary travelled to Antarctica as part of a delegation commemorating the 50th anniversary of the founding of Scott Base.

Public recognition

On 6 June 1953, Hillary was appointed Knight Commander of the Order of the British Empire, and he received the Queen Elizabeth II Coronation Medal the same year. On 6 February 1987, he was the fourth appointee to the Order of New Zealand. He was also awarded the Polar Medal in 1958 for his part in the Commonwealth Trans-Antarctic Expedition, the class of commander of the Order of Sports Merit of France in about 1960, the Order of Gorkha Dakshina Bahu, 1st Class of the Kingdom of Nepal in 1953 and the Coronation Medal in 1975. On 22 April 1995, Hillary was appointed Knight Companion of The Most Noble Order of the Garter. On 17 June 2004, Hillary was awarded the Commander's Cross of the Order of Merit of the Republic of Poland. The Government of India conferred on him its second highest civilian award, the Padma Vibhushan, posthumously, in 2008.

To mark the 50th anniversary of the first successful ascent of Everest, the Nepalese government conferred honorary citizenship upon Hillary at a special Golden Jubilee celebration in Kathmandu, Nepal. He was the first foreign national to receive that honour.

Since 1992, New Zealand's $5 note has featured Hillary's portrait, making him the only living person not a current head of state ever to appear on a New Zealand banknote. In giving his permission, Hillary insisted that Aoraki / Mount Cook rather than Mount Everest be used as the backdrop.

Annual Reader's Digest polls from 2005 to 2007 named Hillary as "New Zealand's most trusted individual".

Hillary's favoured New Zealand charity was the Sir Edmund Hillary Outdoor Pursuits Centre, of which he was patron for 35 years. He was particularly keen on how this organisation introduced young New Zealanders to the outdoors in a very similar way to his first experience of a school trip to Mt Ruapehu at the age of 16. A  bronze statue of Hillary was erected outside The Hermitage Hotel at Mount Cook Village; it was unveiled by Hillary himself in 2003. Various streets, institutions and organisations around New Zealand and abroad are named after him – for example, the Sir Edmund Hillary Collegiate in Otara, which was established by Hillary in 2001.

Two Antarctic features are named after Hillary. The Hillary Coast is a section of coastline south of Ross Island and north of the Shackleton Coast. The Hillary Canyon, an undersea feature in the Ross Sea, appears on the General Bathymetric Chart of the Oceans, published by the International Hydrographic Organization.

Personal life

Hillary married Louise Mary Rose (19301975) on 3 September 1953, soon after the ascent of Everest; he admitted he was terrified of proposing to her and relied on her mother to propose on his behalf. They had three children: Peter (born 1954), Sarah (born 1956) and Belinda (19591975). On 31 March 1975, while en route to join Hillary in the village of Phaphlu, where he was helping to build a hospital, Louise and Belinda were killed in a plane crash  (1975 Royal Nepal Airlines Pilatus PC-6 Porter crash) near Kathmandu airport shortly after take-off. In 1989 he married June Mulgrew, the widow of his close friend Peter Mulgrew, who died on Air New Zealand Flight 901 in 1979.

His son Peter Hillary also became a climber, summiting Everest in 1990. In May 2002 Peter climbed Everest as part of a 50th anniversary celebration; Jamling Tenzing Norgay (son of Tenzing who had died in 1986) was also part of the expedition.

Hillary's home for most of his life was a property on Remuera Road in Auckland City, where he enjoyed reading adventure and science fiction novels in his retirement.
He also built a bach at Whites Beach, one of Auckland's west coast beaches in West Auckland, between Anawhata and North Piha; a friend called it Hillary's place of solace, where he could escape media attention.

The Hillary family has had a connection with the west coast of Auckland since 1925, when Louise's father built a bach at Anawhata. The family donated land at Whites Beach that is now crossed by trampers on the Hillary Trail, named for Edmund.
Hillary said of the area: "That is the thing that international travel brings home to me – it's always good to be going home. This is the only place I want to live in; this is the place I want to see out my days."

Philanthropy

Following his ascent of Everest he devoted himself to assisting the Sherpa people of Nepal through the Himalayan Trust, which he established in 1960 and led until his death in 2008. His efforts are credited with the construction of many schools and hospitals in this remote region of the Himalayas. He was the Honorary President of the American Himalayan Foundation, a United States non-profit body that helps improve the ecology and living conditions in the Himalayas. He was also the Honorary President of Mountain Wilderness, an international NGO dedicated to the worldwide protection of mountains.

Political involvement

Hillary supported the Labour Party in the 1975 New Zealand general election, as a member of the "Citizens for Rowling" campaign. His involvement in this campaign was seen as precluding his nomination as governor-general; the position was offered to Keith Holyoake in 1977. In 1985, Hillary was appointed New Zealand High Commissioner to India (concurrently High Commissioner to Bangladesh and Ambassador to Nepal) and spent four and a half years based in New Delhi.

In 1975, Hillary served as a vice president for the Abortion Law Reform Association of New Zealand, a national pro-choice advocacy group. He was also a patron of REPEAL, an organization seeking repeal of the restrictive Contraception, Sterilisation, and Abortion Act 1977.

Death

On 22 April 2007, while on a trip to Kathmandu, Hillary suffered a fall, and was hospitalised after returning to New Zealand.

On 11 January 2008, he died of heart failure at Auckland City Hospital.
Flags were lowered to half-mast on New Zealand public buildings and at Scott Base in Antarctica, and the Prime Minister, Helen Clark, called Hillary's death a "profound loss to New Zealand".

On 21 January, Hillary's casket was taken into Holy Trinity Cathedral, Auckland, to lie in state.
A state funeral was held on 22 January 2008, after which his body was cremated. On 29 February 2008, most of his ashes were scattered in Auckland's Hauraki Gulf per his desire. The remainder went to a Nepalese monastery near Everest; a plan to scatter them on the summit was cancelled in 2010.

Posthumous tributes

In January 2008, Lukla Airport, in Lukla, Nepal, was renamed to Tenzing–Hillary Airport in recognition of their promotion of its construction.
On 2 April 2008, a service of thanksgiving in Hillary's honour at St George's Chapel at Windsor Castle was attended by Queen Elizabeth II, New Zealand dignitaries including Prime Minister Helen Clark, and members of Hillary's and Norgay's families; Gurkha soldiers from Nepal stood guard outside the ceremony.
In October 2008, it was announced that future rugby test matches between England and New Zealand would be played for the Hillary Shield. In 2009 the Duke of Edinburgh's Award in New Zealandformerly the Young New Zealanders' Challengewas renamed "The Duke of Edinburgh's Hillary Award".
On 5 November 2008, a commemorative set of five stamps was issued by New Zealand Post.

There have been many calls for lasting tributes to Hillary. The first major public tribute has been by way of the "Summits for Ed" tribute tour organised by the Sir Edmund Hillary Foundation. This tribute tour went from Bluff at the bottom of the South Island to Cape Reinga at the tip of the North Island, visiting 39 towns and cities along the way. In each venue, school children and members of the public were invited to join to climb a significant hill or site in their area to show their respect for Hillary. The public were also invited to bring small rocks or pebbles that had special significance to them, that would be included in a memorial to Hillary at the base of Mt Ruapehu, in the grounds of the Sir Edmund Hillary Outdoor Pursuits Centre. Funds donated during the tour are used by the foundation to sponsor young New Zealanders on outdoor courses. Over 8,000 persons attended these "Summit" climbs between March and May 2008.

The tribute song "Hillary 88", by the New Zealand duo The Kiwis, is the official world memorial song for Hillary, with the endorsement of Lady Hillary.

A four-day track in the Waitākere Ranges, along Auckland's west coast, is named the Hillary Trail, in honour of Hillary. Hillary's father-in-law, Jim Rose, who had built a bach at Anawhata in 1925, wrote in his 1982 history of Anawhata Beach, "My family look forward to the time when we will be able to walk from Huia to Muriwai on public walking tracks like the old-time Maori could do". Hillary loved the area, and had his own bach near Anawhata. The track was opened on 11 January 2010, the second anniversary of Hillary's death. Rose Track, descending from Anawhata Road to Whites Beach, is named after the Rose family.

The South Ridge of Aoraki / Mount Cook, New Zealand's highest mountain, was renamed Hillary Ridge on 18 August 2011. Hillary and three other climbers were the first party to successfully climb the ridge in 1948. In September 2013 the Government of Nepal proposed naming a  mountain in Nepal Hillary Peak in his honour. After the New Horizons mission discovered a mountain range on Pluto on 14 July 2015, it was informally named Hillary Montes (Hillary Mountains) by NASA.
The Sir Edmund Hillary Mountain Legacy Medal, awarded by the Nepalese NGO Mountain Legacy "for remarkable service in the conservation of culture and nature in mountainous regions" was inaugurated in 2003, with the approval of Sir Edmund Hillary. 
A bronze bust of Hillary (circa 1953) by Ophelia Gordon Bell is in the Te Papa museum in Wellington, New Zealand.
The Sir Edmund Hillary Archive was added to the UNESCO Memory of the world archive in 2013, it is currently held by Auckland War Memorial Museum.

From 2016 to 2020, a pilot immigration programme to New Zealand awarded Edmund Hillary Fellowships, the benefits of which included a 3-year Global Impact Visa to create, support, and incubate ventures and models that result in positive global impact, from New Zealand.  After 3 years, migrants could qualify for permanent residency. The Edmund Hillary Foundation, which operated the pilot, claims that more than 250 of the allocated 400 visas were awarded before the pilot closed.

Arms

Publications

Notes

References

Citations

See Also
 1975 Royal Nepal Airlines Pilatus PC-6 Porter crash

Sources

 (The Summit (Chapter 16, pp 197–209) is by Hillary)

External links

 from the Dictionary of New Zealand Biography
On top of the world: Ed Hillary at nzhistory.net.nz 
Videos (10) at the New Zealand National Film Unit
Obituary of Edmund Hillary at tributes.com
"Interview with Sir Edmund Hillary: Mountain Climbing" at Smithsonian Folkways
Edmund Hillary on BBC Radio 4's Desert Island Discs, 17 April 1979
Edmund Hillary's collection at Auckland War Memorial Museum Tāmaki Paenga Hira
Edmund Hillary addressing The New York Herald Tribune Book and Author Luncheon, February 10, 1954 broadcast by WNYC
 
 

1919 births
2008 deaths
Ambassadors of New Zealand to Nepal
New Zealand autobiographers
Explorers of Antarctica
High Commissioners of New Zealand to Bangladesh
High Commissioners of New Zealand to India
People in sports awarded knighthoods
Members of the Order of Gorkha Dakshina Bahu, First Class
New Zealand and the Antarctic
New Zealand explorers
New Zealand humanitarians
New Zealand military personnel of World War II
New Zealand mountain climbers
New Zealand memoirists
New Zealand male writers
New Zealand people of English descent
Non-fiction outdoors writers
People educated at Auckland Grammar School
People from Auckland
Recipients of the Padma Vibhushan in sports
Commanders of the Order of Merit of the Republic of Poland
Royal New Zealand Air Force personnel
New Zealand summiters of Mount Everest
University of Auckland alumni
New Zealand beekeepers
New Zealand recipients of the Polar Medal
New Zealand Knights Commander of the Order of the British Empire
Members of the Order of New Zealand
New Zealand Knights of the Garter
Honorary Citizens of Nepal
People associated with the Auckland War Memorial Museum
20th-century memoirists